Chicago at Carnegie Hall (also known as Chicago IV) is the first live album, and fourth album overall, by American band Chicago. It was initially released on October 25, 1971 by Columbia Records as a four-LP vinyl box set, and was also available for a time as two separate two-record sets. A Quadraphonic mix of the album was proposed, but was never made, possibly due to the band's objection to the album being released in the first place. This is the only Chicago album of the group's first ten releases not to have a Quadraphonic release in any format.

The album reached No. 3 on the Billboard 200. It was certified gold by the Recording Industry Association of America (RIAA) two weeks after its release, and was certified platinum in 1986.

Background
While touring in support of Chicago III, Chicago played Carnegie Hall for a week in April 1971 and recorded all of their shows. A four-LP box set collection for release as Chicago's fourth album (that distinction being responsible for the album's nickname of Chicago IV) was the result. Walter Parazaider told writer William James Ruhlmann that The reason behind the live record for Carnegie Hall is, we were the first rock 'n' roll group to sell out a week at Carnegie Hall, and that was worth rolling up the trucks for, putting the mikes up there, and really chronicling what happened in 1971.

Columbia were very skeptical on the risk the extended set posed, and with a decrease in royalties to counter that fear (a similar situation befell their 1969 debut Chicago Transit Authority), Chicago released Chicago at Carnegie Hall that October to a mixed reaction. While the set sold very well, reaching No. 3 in the US (but failing to chart at all in the UK), the critics found the album too long—and even indulgent with its inclusions of tune-ups.

The band themselves have remained divided through the years over the merits of the album. Robert Lamm and Walter Parazaider defended the album to William James Ruhlmann, while James Pankow and Peter Cetera were not happy with the result. Pankow told Ruhlmann, I hate it. ... The acoustics of Carnegie Hall were never meant for amplified music, ...the sound of the brass after being miked came out sounding like kazoos. Lee Loughnane said that although he thinks the album is good, there were many things he didn't like about it and that he didn't think the album should have been released.

In recognition of setting Carnegie Hall records and the ensuing four LP live recordings, the group was awarded a Billboard 1972 Trendsetter Award. Despite poor sound quality, Chicago at Carnegie Hall, according to William James Ruhlmann, went on to become "perhaps" the best-selling box set by a rock act until the release of the Live/1975-85 five-LP live box set by Bruce Springsteen & the E Street Band in 1986. It is still the best-selling four-LP set.

In 2005, Chicago at Carnegie Hall was remastered and re-issued on three CDs by Rhino Records with much improved sound quality, a bonus disc of eight tracks of alternate takes and songs not on the 1971 edition, plus recreations of nearly all the original posters and packaging.

On Monday April 5th, 2021, 50 years to the day of their first Carnegie Hall show, Rhino Records announced a 50th Anniversary 16-CD box set called "Chicago Live At Carnegie Hall Complete". The collection includes all six shows in their entirety which were performed from April 5th through April 10th, 1971, plus two matinee performances. The set was produced by engineer Tim Jessup along with band member Lee Loughnane, and was released on September 10, 2021.

Artwork and packaging
The original LP release of this set contained two giant posters of the band, a poster of Carnegie Hall's exterior, an insert about voting information, and a 20-page softcover booklet; this last contained photos of the band members playing during the concert, and on the back bore a full touring schedule from their first tour through their 1971 US tour. The band's official web site labels the cover design "white tile".

Track listing

Personnel
 Robert Lamm – keyboards, lead and backing vocals
 Terry Kath – guitar, lead and backing vocals
 Peter Cetera – bass, lead and backing vocals
 James Pankow – trombone, percussion
 Walter Parazaider – woodwinds, percussion
 Lee Loughnane – trumpet, percussion, guitar on tracks 13 and 16
 Danny Seraphine – drums

Production
 Produced by James William Guercio
 Engineers – Don Puluse, Bud Graham, Hank Altman, Aaron Baron and Larry Dahlstrom.
 Recorded at Carnegie Hall, New York, NY (by Location Recorders).
 Mixed at Columbia Recording Studios, New York, NY.
 Art Direction – John Berg/Virginia Team
 Artwork – Fuding Cheng
 Poster Design – Ron Coro
 Photography – Allen Goldblatt and Fred Lombardi
 Poster Photo – Frank Laffire
 Lettering – Beverly Scott

Charts

References

Albums produced by James William Guercio
Albums recorded at Carnegie Hall
Chicago (band) live albums
1971 live albums
Columbia Records live albums